Michał Kleofas Ogiński (25 September 176515 October 1833) was a Polish diplomat and politician, Grand Treasurer of Lithuania, and a senator of Tsar Alexander I. He was also a composer of early Romantic music.

Early life

Ogiński was born in Guzów in Mazovia (west of Warsaw) in the Kingdom of Poland. His father, Andrzej, was a Polish-Lithuanian nobleman from the Ogiński family and Trakai governor of the Grand Duchy of Lithuania. Hence, some sources indicate that Michał Oginski was Lithuanian. His mother, Paulina Szembek (1740–1797), was the daughter of Polish magnate, Marek Szembek, whose ancestors were Austrian, and Jadwiga Rudnicka, who was of Lithuanian descent. His first introduction to music arose during a visit to relatives at Słonim where Michał Kazimierz Ogiński had a contemporary European theatre that hosted opera and ballet productions. Michał Kleofas received an Enlightenment gentleman's education. He studied music with Józef Kozłowski and took violin lessons from Giovanni Battista Viotti and Pierre Baillot.

Career

Aged only 20, Ogiński was chosen as an envoy of the Polish–Lithuanian Commonwealth. He served as an adviser to King Stanisław August Poniatowski and supported him during the Great Sejm of 1788–1792.

Great Sejm 
In 1788 he received the Order of Saint Stanislaus and in 1789 - the Order of the White Eagle, Poland's highest order. In 1790 he was dispatched as a diplomatic representative to the United Kingdom, where he met with Lord Mansfield who warned him about the danger posed by the tri-partite powers about to dismember the Kingdom of Poland. After 1790, he was sent to The Hague as a diplomatic representative of Poland to the Netherlands and was Polish agent in Constantinople and Paris. In 1793, he was nominated to the office of Vice-Treasurer of Lithuania.

Kościuszko Uprising 
During the Kościuszko Uprising in 1794, Ogiński commanded his own unit. After the insurrection was suppressed, he emigrated to Constantinople and later to France, where he sought support for the Polish-Lithuanian Commonwealth.

Napoleonic Wars 
At that time he saw the creation of the Duchy of Warsaw by the Emperor as a stepping stone to the eventual full independence of the Commonwealth. He dedicated his only opera, Zelis et Valcour, to Napoleon. In 1810, Ogiński withdrew from political activity in exile and, disappointed with Napoleon, returned to Vilnius. Adam Jerzy Czartoryski introduced him to Tsar Alexander I, who made Ogiński a Russian Senator. Ogiński tried in vain to convince the Tsar to reconstitute the former Commonwealth. Disillusioned, he moved abroad in 1815. He died in Florence in 1833.

Works

As a composer, he is best known for his polonaise Farewell to My Homeland (Pożegnanie Ojczyzny), written in 1794 in the Zalesie region (then part of the Polish-Lithuanian Commonwealth, today in Belarus), on the occasion of his emigration after the suppression of the Kościuszko Uprising. This piece, with its unreservedly melancholic melodies and fantasia-like passages, can be considered among the earliest examples of romantic music.

Ogiński admired French and Italian opera. He was a violinist, and played the clavichord and the balalaika. He began composing marches and military songs in the 1790s that gained popularity among the rebels of 1794. He composed some 20 polonaises, piano pieces, mazurkas, marches, romances and waltzes.

Some of his other popular works and compositions include:
 Opera Zelis et Valcour, ou 'Bonaparte au Caire' (1799).
 Treatise 'Letters about music' (1828).
 'Mémoires sur la Pologne et les Polonais, depuis 1788 jusqu'à la fin de 1815' ('Memories of Poland and the Poles, from 1788 until the end of 1815'), published in Paris.

See also
 Feliks Łubieński
 Marcjan Aleksander Ogiński

References

Sources

External links

Michał Kleofas Ogiński: Thematic Catalogue of Compositions
Ogiński's biography at Polish Music Center
 Works by Michał Kleofas Ogiński in digital library Polona

1765 births
1833 deaths
Lithuanian diplomats
Polish composers
Diplomats of the Polish–Lithuanian Commonwealth
Grand Treasurers of the Grand Duchy of Lithuania
Paymasters
Senators of the Russian Empire
Knights of Malta
People from Żyrardów County
Michal Kleofas
Recipients of the Order of the White Eagle (Poland)